The Shina   (Shina: ݜݨیاٗ) are an Indo-Aryan ethnolinguistic group primarily residing in Gilgit–Baltistan and Indus Kohistan in Pakistan, as well as in the Dras Valley and Kishenganga Valley (Gurez) in the northern region of Jammu and Kashmir and Ladakh in India. They speak an Indo-Aryan language, called Shina and their geographic area of predominance is referred to as Shenaki.

Geography 
In Pakistan, the Shina, who are also known as Gilgitis there, is the major ethnic group of Gilgit-Baltistan and the Shina language is spoken by an estimated 600,000 people living mainly in Gilgit-Baltistan and Kohistan. People belonging to the Shina community people are also settled in the upper Neelum Valley in Pakistan, as well as in Dras, in the far north of the Kargil district of Ladakh in India. Outliers of Shina such as Brokskat speakers are found in Ladakh, Palula and Sawi speakers in Chitral, Ushojo speakers in the Swat Valley, and Kalkoti speakers in Dir. Many Shina people have also migrated to Karachi and Islamabad for employment, carrying out business, and education purposes, and many of them have permanently settled in these cities.

History
The Shina expanded to the Gilgit region from their homeland in Shinkari, in the Kohistan region on the Indus River sometime around the 9th or 10th century. Soon after the Shina began settling in Chitral, parts of the Nagar Valley, and as far as Baltistan and Kargil.

The Shina people historically practised Hinduism, as well as Buddhism. However, both Hinduism and Buddhism were regulated to being the religion of the ruling and upper class although Hinduism had more success among the masses. Their chief peculiarity was their feeling towards the cow, which they held in abhorrence and was considered by them as unclean. Even after the majority of the ethnic group's conversion to Islam, orthodox Shins would continue to neither eat beef, drink cow's milk nor touch any vessel containing it, because a dead cow or a suckling calf is considered especially unclean, so that purification was necessary even if the garments touched it. In Gilgit, Hunza and Nagar, the Hindu Shins formerly practised sati, which ceased before A.D. 1740. 1877, in that region, marked the last year that Shina men underwent Hindu cremation rites.

The Shina were exposed to Islam around the 12th century. Waves of conversions occurred during the 14th, 16th and 17th centuries. By the late 19th century, most Shina were adherents of Islam. Many castes of the Shina people, such as the Açar'îta caste, converted to Islam in the 19th century and this faith is now observed by the majority of the ethnic group. A small minority of related ethnic groups, chiefly the Brokpa community, continue to practice Buddhism and Hinduism, though the majority of them are adherents to Islam.

Genetics
Mah Noor et al. (2019) found west Eurasian mtDNA in 89% (8/9) of Shina samples, which included 11.1% (one sample each) from the following haplogroups, H14a, T1a, H2a, T2, U7,  U5b and HV2. Besides, 11.1% (1/9) of the samples belonged to haplogroup M54, which is of South Asian origin. The obtained mtDNA sequences of Shina were compared with surrounding north-western Pakistani population groups. The haplogroups frequencies, phylogenetic tree and network analysis identified the west Eurasian ancestral origin of Shina group with nearby maternal ancestral relationships with the Kashmiri population. However, no close genetic relationship of Shina was depicted with nearby residing Kho population group.

Festivals   
The Shina festival of Chili marks the commencement of wheat sowing, as with other celebrations in the Indian subcontinent, including Lohri and Makar Sakranti. Chilli also formerly had a connection with the worship of the cedar. Cedar worship is prevalent among historic the Hindu communities of Himalayas, from the Hindu Kush region to Himachal and Uttarakhand. It is known as Deodar, which is derived from the Sanskrit word Devadaru, which means "wood of the gods" and is a compound of the words deva (god) and dāru (wood, etym. tree). The Cedar is also sacred in Kafiristan.

Notable people 

 Hasan Raheem

See also
Shina language
Gilgit Scouts

References

Ethnic groups in Pakistan
Social groups of Khyber Pakhtunkhwa
Social groups of Jammu and Kashmir
Social groups of Gilgit Baltistan
 
Dardic peoples
Ethnic groups in India